Burdett is a city in Pawnee County, Kansas, United States.  As of the 2020 census, the population of the city was 228.

History
Burdett was a station and shipping point on the division of the Atchison, Topeka and Santa Fe Railway that ran from Larned to Jetmore. The community was named for the American humorist writer Robert Jones Burdette.

A post office was opened in Brown's Grove (an extinct town) in 1877, but it was moved to Burdett in 1887.

Geography
Burdett is located at  (38.193410, -99.526456).

Climate
The climate in this area is characterized by hot, humid summers and generally mild to cool winters.  According to the Köppen Climate Classification system, Burdett has a humid subtropical climate, abbreviated "Cfa" on climate maps.

Demographics

2010 census
As of the census of 2010, there were 247 people, 102 households, and 68 families residing in the city. The racial makeup of the city was 99.2% White, 0.4% African American, and 0.4% Native American. Hispanic or Latino of any race were 0.8% of the population.

There were 102 households, of which 33.3% had children under the age of 18 living with them, 56.9% were married couples living together, 6.9% had a female householder with no husband present, 2.9% had a male householder with no wife present, and 33.3% were non-families. 33.3% of all households were made up of individuals, and 16.7% had someone living alone who was 65 years of age or older. The average household size was 2.42 and the average family size was 3.06.

The median age in the city was 41.3 years. 29.1% of residents were under the age of 18; 6.6% were between the ages of 18 and 24; 18.7% were from 25 to 44; 24.4% were from 45 to 64; and 21.5% were 65 years of age or older. The gender makeup of the city was 49.8% male and 50.2% female.

2000 census
As of the census of 2000, there were 256 people, 108 households, and 74 families residing in the city. The racial makeup of the city was 96.09% White, 3.12% Native American, 0.39% from other races, and 0.39% from two or more races. Hispanic or Latino of any race were 3.52% of the population.

There were 108 households, out of which 29.6% had children under the age of 18 living with them, 60.2% were married couples living together, 5.6% had a female householder with no husband present, and 30.6% were non-families. 29.6% of all households were made up of individuals, and 16.7% had someone living alone who was 65 years of age or older. The average household size was 2.37 and the average family size was 2.95.

In the city, the population was spread out, with 28.9% under the age of 18, 6.3% from 18 to 24, 21.1% from 25 to 44, 22.7% from 45 to 64, and 21.1% who were 65 years of age or older. The median age was 40 years. For every 100 females, there were 106.5 males. For every 100 females age 18 and over, there were 106.8 males.

The median income for a household in the city was $37,000, and the median income for a family was $49,375. Males had a median income of $27,917 versus $21,563 for females. The per capita income for the city was $19,490. About 6.3% of families and 5.5% of the population were below the poverty line, including 10.3% of those under the age of eighteen and none of those 65 or over.

Education
Burdett is served by USD 496 Pawnee Heights. The Pawnee Heights High School mascot is Tigers.

Burdett High School was closed through school unification. The Burdett Tigers won the Kansas State High School boys class BB basketball championship in 1954.

Notable people
 Clyde Tombaugh, the astronomer who discovered the dwarf planet Pluto in 1930, lived in Burdett during part of his teens.

References

Further reading

External links
 City of Burdett
 Burdett - Directory of Public Officials
 USD 496, local school district
 Historic Images of Burdett, Wichita State University Library
 Burdett city map, KDOT

Cities in Kansas
Cities in Pawnee County, Kansas